was a town located in Mino District, Hyōgo Prefecture, Japan.

As of 2003, the town had an estimated population of 9,486 and a density of 168.04 persons per km2. The total area was 56.45 km2.

On October 24, 2005, Yokawa was merged into the expanded city of Miki.

Dissolved municipalities of Hyōgo Prefecture
Miki, Hyōgo